Agnes Harrold (c. 1831 – 7 July 1903) was a New Zealand hotel manager, foster parent, nurse and midwife. She was born near Hudson Bay, Canada circa 1831. Born Agnes Grieve, she married near Hudson Bay, coming to Stewart Island in 1861 where she ran a hotel "The Travellers Rest" while her husband was at sea. In the small community of 2 to 300, she was the unofficial doctor.

References

1831 births
1903 deaths
New Zealand nurses
New Zealand midwives
New Zealand hoteliers
Canadian emigrants to New Zealand
19th-century New Zealand people
New Zealand women nurses